The Ghost Talks is a 1949 comedy horror short subject, directed by Jules White. The stars are the American slapstick comedy team The Three Stooges (Moe Howard, Larry Fine and Shemp Howard). It is the 113th entry in the series released by Columbia Pictures starring the comedians, who released 190 shorts for the studio between 1934 and 1959.

Plot
The Stooges are moving men assigned to move furniture out of the haunted Smorgasbord Castle. All goes well at first, outside of a few scares, until a clanking suit of armor inhabited by the ghost of Peeping Tom (voiced by Phil Arnold) scares the hapless Stooges. Tom manages to convince them that he is, in fact, a friendly spirit. After finally gaining their trust, Tom tells the trio his origin story of watching Lady Godiva (Nancy Saunders), only to get a pie in the face. In turn, his ghost is cursed and trapped inside the suit of armor. He has been trapped for a thousand years.

The Stooges, however, still have a job to do, and tell Tom that they have to move everything in the castle, including him. He instructs the boys to leave him be, as "bad luck" will be upon them if they ever try to take him away. Shemp, Larry and Moe all take turns trying to move Tom, but a series of various shenanigans spooks the Stooges. The Incidents they encounter include a frog jumping down Shemp's shirt, and an owl entering a skull and assuming the role of a death's head spirit.

As they run into another room to escape, Lady Godiva rides up on a horse and takes Tom away. The Stooges rush over to the window to watch them depart, only to be pelted with three successive pies amidst a cheering crowd.

Cast

Credited

Production notes
The Ghost Talks was filmed on August 26–29, 1947, and released 18 months later on February 3, 1949. It was remade in 1956 as Creeps, using ample stock footage.

Director Jules White voiced the skeleton identifying himself as "Red Skeleton", a reference to comedian Red Skelton.

The NBC chimes are heard when Moe hits Shemp three times on his head.

See also
List of ghost films

References

External links
 
 

1949 films
1949 comedy films
1949 horror films
1949 short films
1940s ghost films
1940s comedy horror films
The Three Stooges films
Columbia Pictures short films
American comedy horror films
American slapstick comedy films
American black-and-white films
Films directed by Jules White
Films set in castles
Lady Godiva
1940s English-language films
1940s American films